Minna Kauppi (born 25 November 1982) is a Finnish orienteer, who was born in Asikkala and lives in Lahti.  Kauppi is a nine-time World Champion, including five golds from relays.
Kauppi anchored her Finnish club Asikkalan Raikas to a victory in the 2007 Venla relay.

See also
 List of orienteers
 List of orienteering events

References

External links

1982 births
Living people
Finnish orienteers
Female orienteers
Foot orienteers
World Orienteering Championships medalists
World Games gold medalists
World Games silver medalists
Competitors at the 2009 World Games
Competitors at the 2013 World Games
World Games medalists in orienteering
People from Asikkala
Sportspeople from Päijät-Häme
Junior World Orienteering Championships medalists